SM UB-90 was a German Type UB III submarine or U-boat in the German Imperial Navy during World War I. She was commissioned into the German Imperial Navy on 21 March 1918 as SM UB-90.

All 38 crew members died in the event.

Construction

She was built by AG Vulcan of Hamburg and following just under a year of construction, launched at Hamburg on 12 February 1918. UB-90 was commissioned early the next year under the command of Oblt.z.S. Gottfried von Mayer. Like all Type UB III submarines, UB-90 carried 10 torpedoes and was armed with a  deck gun. UB-90 had a displacement of  while surfaced and  when submerged. Her engines enabled her to travel at  when surfaced and  when submerged.

Summary of raiding history

References

Notes

Citations

Bibliography 

 

German Type UB III submarines
World War I submarines of Germany
U-boats commissioned in 1918
1918 ships
Ships built in Hamburg
U-boats sunk by British submarines
U-boats sunk in 1918
Maritime incidents in 1918
World War I shipwrecks in the North Sea
Ships lost with all hands